Luigi Diberti (born 29 September 1939) is an Italian actor. He has appeared in more than 100 films and television shows since 1968. He starred in Magnificat, which was entered into the 1993 Cannes Film Festival.

Selected filmography
 Metello (1970)
 The Working Class Goes to Heaven (1971)
 The Seduction of Mimi (1972)
 Beau Masque (1972)
 Libera, My Love (1973)
 Wifemistress (1977)
 Last Feelings (1978)
 The Secret (1990)
 Magnificat (1993)
 The Stendhal Syndrome (1996)
 Padre Pio: Between Heaven and Earth (2000)
 I Am Emma (2002)
 Einstein (2008)

References

External links

1939 births
Living people
Italian male film actors
Actors from Turin
Accademia Nazionale di Arte Drammatica Silvio D'Amico alumni
20th-century Italian male actors
21st-century Italian male actors